The 2001–02 Arizona Wildcats men's basketball team represented the University of Arizona. The head coach was Lute Olson. The team played its home games in the McKale Center in Tucson, Arizona, and was a member of the Pacific-10 Conference. In the Pac-10 Basketball Tournament, Arizona beat USC by a score of 81–71 to claim its fourth Pac-10 title.

Roster

Depth chart

Schedule

|-
!colspan=12 style="background:#; color:#;"|Regular season

|-
!colspan=12 style="background:#;"| Pac-10 tournament

|-
!colspan=12 style="background:#;"| NCAA tournament

Awards and honors
 Lute Olson, Enshrined in Basketball Hall of Fame on June 5, 2002
 Salim Stoudamire, Pac-10 Freshman of the Year
 Luke Walton, Pacific-10 Tournament Most Outstanding Player

References

Arizona Wildcats
Arizona Wildcats men's basketball seasons
Pac-12 Conference men's basketball tournament championship seasons
Arizona Wildcats
Arizona Wildcats
Arizona